Priapismus is a genus of shield bugs in the subfamily Discocephalinae, erected by Distant in 1889.

References

External links
 

Pentatomidae
Pentatomidae genera